The 2016 CONCACAF Women's Olympic Qualifying Championship was the 4th edition of the CONCACAF Women's Olympic Qualifying Tournament, the quadrennial international football tournament organized by CONCACAF to determine which women's national teams from the North, Central American and Caribbean region qualify for the Olympic football tournament. CONCACAF announced on 12 August 2015 that the United States would host the tournament between 10–21 February 2016 in Houston and Frisco, Texas. A total of eight teams played in the tournament.

The top two teams of the tournament qualified for the 2016 Summer Olympics women's football tournament in Brazil as the CONCACAF representatives.

The United States won the tournament with a 2–0 final win over Canada. Both teams qualified for the Olympics, their sixth and third in a row respectively.

Qualification

The eight berths were allocated to the three regional zones as follows:
Three teams from the North American Zone (NAFU), i.e., Canada, Mexico and the hosts United States, who all qualified automatically due to being the only teams in the zone
Two teams from the Central American Zone (UNCAF)
Three teams from the Caribbean Zone (CFU)

Regional qualification tournaments were held to determine the five teams joining Canada, Mexico, and the United States at the final tournament.

Qualified teams
The following eight teams qualified for the final tournament.

Venues
The two venues were announced by CONCACAF on 12 August 2015.
BBVA Compass Stadium, Houston
Toyota Stadium, Frisco

Draw
The draw for the tournament took place on 23 November 2015 at 10:00 EST (UTC−5) at the InterContinental Doral in Doral, Florida. The draw was conducted by Cat Whitehill and Tiffany Roberts.

The eight teams were drawn into two groups of four teams. Tournament host, defending CONCACAF Olympic Qualifying Championship champion and 2012 Olympic gold medalist United States were seeded in Group A.

Squads

Each team could register a maximum of 20 players (two of whom must be goalkeepers).

Group stage
The top two teams of each group advanced to the semi-finals. The teams were ranked according to points (3 points for a win, 1 point for a draw, 0 points for a loss). If tied on points, tiebreakers would be applied in the following order:
Goal difference in all group matches;
Greatest number of goals scored in all group matches;
Greatest number of points obtained in the group matches between the teams concerned;
Goal difference resulting from the group matches between the teams concerned;
Greater number of goals scored in all group matches between the teams concerned;
Drawing of lots.

All times were local, CST (UTC−6).

Group A

Group B

Knockout stage
In the knockout stage, extra time and penalty shoot-out would be used to decide the winner if necessary.

Bracket

Semi-finals
Winners qualified for 2016 Summer Olympics.

Final

Final ranking
As per statistical convention in football, matches decided in extra time are counted as wins and losses, while matches decided by penalty shoot-outs are counted as draws.

Qualified teams for Olympics
The following two teams from CONCACAF qualified for the Olympic football tournament.

1 Bold indicates champion for that year. Italic indicates host for that year.

Goalscorers
6 goals

 Raquel Rodríguez
 Crystal Dunn

5 goals

 Alex Morgan

4 goals

 Maribel Domínguez
 Carli Lloyd

3 goals

 Ashley Lawrence
 Nichelle Prince
 Rebecca Quinn
 Deanne Rose
 Christine Sinclair
 Melissa Tancredi
 Karla Villalobos
 Kennya Cordner

2 goals

 Janine Beckie
 Ana Martínez
 Tobin Heath
 Christen Press

1 goal

 Kadeisha Buchanan
 Gabrielle Carle
 Jessie Fleming
 Diana Matheson
 Shirley Cruz
 Melissa Herrera
 Diana Sáenz
 Mariam El-Masri
 Alison Heydorn
 Bria Williams
 Alina Garciamendez
 Katlyn Johnson
 Nayeli Rangel
 Jenelle Cunningham
 Ahkeela Mollon
 Mariah Shade
 Tasha St. Louis
 Lindsey Horan
 Kelley O'Hara
 Sam Mewis

Own goal
 Ashley Rivera (playing against United States)

Awards
The following awards were given at the conclusion of the tournament.

Best XI
Goalkeeper:  Hope Solo
Right Defender:  Kelley O'Hara
Central Defender:  Becky Sauerbrunn
Central Defender:  Kadeisha Buchanan
Left Defender:  Allysha Chapman
Right Midfielder:  Tobin Heath
Central Midfielder:  Lindsey Horan
Central Midfielder:  Morgan Brian
Left Midfielder:  Ashley Lawrence
Forward:  Alex Morgan
Forward:  Carli Lloyd

Golden Ball
 Morgan Brian

Golden Boot
 Crystal Dunn (6 goals)

Golden Glove
 Hope Solo

Fair Play Award

Footnotes

References

External links
Olympic Qualifying – Women, CONCACAF.com

 
2016
Olympic Qualifying Championship, Women's
Concacaf Women's Olympic Qualifying Championship
Concacaf
Olympic Qualifying Championship, Women's
2016 CONCACAF Women's Olympic Qualifying Championship
2016 in American women's soccer